In sociology, a tipping point is a point in time when a group—or many group members—rapidly and dramatically changes its behavior by widely adopting a previously rare practice.

History

The phrase was first used in sociology by Morton Grodzins when he adopted the phrase from physics where it referred to the adding a small amount of weight to a balanced object until the additional weight caused the object to suddenly and completely topple, or tip.  Grodzins studied integrating American neighborhoods in the early 1960s. He discovered that most of the white families remained in the neighborhood as long as the comparative number of black families remained very small. But, at a certain point, when "one too many" black families arrived, the remaining white families would move out en masse in a process known as white flight. He called that moment the "tipping point".

The idea was expanded and built upon by Nobel Prize-winner Thomas Schelling in 1971. A similar idea underlies Mark Granovetter's threshold model of collective behavior.

10% of a Population
Scientists at Rensselaer Polytechnic Institute have found that when just 10% of the population holds an unshakable belief, their belief will always be adopted by the majority of people who simply change their beliefs if their last two social interactions agreed with a new one.

Other uses
The phrase has extended beyond its original meaning and been applied to any process in which, beyond a certain point, the rate of the process increases dramatically. It has been applied in many fields, from economics to human ecology to epidemiology. It can also be compared to phase transition in physics or the propagation of populations in an unbalanced ecosystem.

Journalists and academics have applied the phrase to dramatic changes in governments, such as during the Arab Spring. The concept of a tipping point is described in an article in an academic journal, the Journal of Democracy, titled "China at the Tipping Point? Foreseeing the unforeseeable":

Regime transitions belong to that paradoxical class of events which are inevitable but not predictable. Other examples are bank runs, currency inflations, strikes, migrations, riots, and revolutions. In retrospect, such events are explainable, even overdetermined. In prospect, however, their timing and character are impossible to anticipate. Such events
seem to come closer and closer but do not occur, even when all the conditions are ripe—until suddenly they do.

American journalists at NPR have used it to describe an influx of sexual assault allegations, saying that a tipping point has been passed regarding societal tolerance of sexual harassment and feminism.

Mathematically, the angle of repose may be seen as a bifurcation. In control theory, the concept of positive feedback describes the same phenomenon, with the problem of balancing an inverted pendulum being the classic embodiment. The concept has also been applied to the popular acceptance of new technologies, for example being used to explain the success of VHS over Betamax.

Decarbonization

The concept of social tipping points has been applied to analyze global decarbonization pathways and the ability to activate contagious and fast-spreading processes of social and technological change that would accelerate carbon emission reductions needed to achieve the goals of the Paris Agreement.

A study suggests, "path dependencies, increasing returns to scale and learning-by-doing cost reductions can produce sudden, tipping-point-like transitions that cannot be extrapolated from past system behaviour", and that "historically, technological innovation and government policies often motivated by energy security concerns have also, in notable cases, spurred rapid shifts in energy systems".

Moreover, "social norms that shape individual behaviour and preferences can exhibit similar tipping-point style dynamics", which could affect "the regulatory and market conditions in which energy technologies compete". When social norms of sustainability are costly – or at least detrimental rather than beneficial – for individuals to violate, this may substantially increase the probability that an individual engages in pro-environmental behaviour.

In popular culture
The term was popularized in application to daily life by Malcolm Gladwell's 2000 bestselling book The Tipping Point: How Little Things Can Make a Big Difference.

See also

 Cascading failure
 Catastrophe theory
 Chaos theory
 Critical mass
 Domino effect
 Emergence
 Hundredth monkey effect
 Information cascade
 Inflection point
 Micromotives and Macrobehavior
 Microtrends: The Small Forces Behind Tomorrow's Big Changes
 Network effect
 Interconnectedness
 Saddle-node bifurcation
 Self-fulfilling prophecy
 Straw that broke the camel's back
 Traffic congestion
 Viral phenomenon
 Virtuous circle and vicious circle

References

External links
 Tipping Point-Net Version (Robert Paterson's Weblog)

Group processes
Sociological terminology
Behavior modification
Attitude change

he:נקודת המפנה